Mijeon station is a railway station on the Gyeongbu Line and Mijeon Line(a branch line of Gyeongbu Line) in Korea.

Railway stations in South Gyeongsang Province